Sherryl Maree Garbutt  (born 5 May 1948) is a former Australian politician. Garbutt was awarded the Medal in the Order of Australia in the 2020 Australia Day Honours.

Early life
Born in Melbourne, Victoria, she attended Oak Park High School before receiving her tertiary education at the University of Melbourne (Bachelor of Arts 1968, Diploma of Education 1969) and at La Trobe University (Bachelor of Education 1979). She is also a Justice of the Peace. In 1970 she became a secondary school teacher, and from 1982 to 1989 she was electorate officer to state Labor minister Pauline Toner.

Political career
In 1989, she succeeded Toner in the seat of Greensborough in a by-election. In 1992 her seat was abolished and she transferred to Bundoora. She also entered the shadow ministry that year, serving as Shadow Minister for Community Services (1992–96), Women's Affairs (1993–96), Environment, Conservation and Land Management (1996–99), and Water Resources (1997–99). When Labor won office under Steve Bracks in 1999, she became Minister for Women's Affairs, Environment and Conservation. Although she remained Minister for Environment and Conservation, Garbutt lost responsibility for Land Victoria in the reshuffled Bracks Cabinet following the 2002 elections.  Land Victoria was assigned to Planning Minister Mary Delahunty. In 2002 she transferred to Community Services. She retired in 2006.

Parliament's Public Accounts and Estimates Committee (PAEC) Inquiry
As Minister for Environment and Conservation, Garbutt was subject to scrutiny by the Parliament's Public Accounts and Estimates Committee (PAEC) Inquiry into 2002–03 budget estimates on 25 June 2002, concerning her failure to table the 1999–2000 and 2000–01 Reports of the Surveyor-General of Victoria, Keith Clifford Bell, as required under the Survey Coordination Act (1958). Although she advised the PAEC that the reports were not tabled as she considered them inaccurate, she was unable to provide any details of inaccuracies.  Garbutt was also interviewed on ABC Radio by Virginia Trioli on 1 July 2002 and again claimed that the Surveyor-General's reports were inaccurate, but was unable to provide any details of her claims of inaccuracies.  The reports were subsequently tabled without alteration and Garbutt made no further claims of inaccuracies.  Notably, the Executive Director of Land Victoria, Elizabeth O'Keeffe, to whom the Surveyor-General reported through to Garbutt and the Department of Natural Resources and Environment (DNRE) Secretary Chloe Munro left her position in August 2002.  It was noted that Garbutt had received her advice on unsubstantiated inaccuracies in the Surveyor-General's reports from O'Keeffe. From the outset, both the Victorian Government Solicitor and the Auditor-General had advised that such reports should be tabled without interference.  Matters raised by the Surveyor-General were also reported in the Auditor-General's own investigations and confirmed.

Auditor-General's Investigation
Concerns raised in the Surveyor-General's reports were confirmed by the Auditor-General, who in 2002 reviewed the functions and responsibilities of the Surveyor-General. The Surveyor-General reported to Minister (Garbutt) and was under Land Victoria for administration, a responsibility of Garbutt. The Auditor-General identified the interference by Land Victoria in the performance of the Surveyor-General's responsibilities, including the wrongful transfer of the Surveyor-General's responsibilities to other units of Land Victoria outside of the Office of Surveyor-General, viz. the Land Information Group under its then Director, Stephen Jacoby . The Auditor-General advised that the Surveyor-General's responsibilities could not be transferred without legislative mandate, consistent with the opinion of the Victorian Government Solicitor. The Auditor-General found that the transfer of the functions of the Surveyor-General had seen them delivered unsatisfactorily by the Land Information Group, and failing to meet the legislative obligations.  The Opposition directed all blame for concerns to Minister Garbutt, and emphasized the extreme political interference in the performance of the statutory functions of the Surveyor-General by Garbutt, DNRE Secretary Munro Land Victoria senior management under Executive Director, Elizabeth O'Keeffe.

Estate Agents Guarantee Fund (EAGF)
Further concerns about Garbutt were raised in the Parliament, on 17 April 2002 and again on 17 October 2002, by Opposition environment spokesman Victor Perton, regarding the attempted misuse of millions of dollars from the Estate Agents Guarantee Fund (EAGF) by Land Victoria and the Department of Justice (DoJ). Specifically, Perton reported that Land Victoria and the Department of Justice had "conspired to invent a 'survey reform' project to win $7.5 million from the fund.  Land Victoria, a division of DNRE, under direction of the Executive Director O’Keeffe, and in collaboration with DoJ, was reported to have attempted to create “the survey project” to obtain extra government funding through EAGF, despite already having been funded.  The administration of EAGF was under DoJ. It was later reported that  the Surveyor-General had reported his concerns to the Auditor-General who stepped into to prevent it proceeding.  The Surveyor-General also reported his concerns to the Ombudsman.  Perton, in April 2002 in Parliament and earlier in the media, quoted "from documents from 2001 in which the assistant director of land records and information services, Ivan Powell, talks of having 'invented some benefits' in regards to the project and of a request to 'invent another layer of detail'. Powell was a senior Land Registry official (under Land Victoria).

Political Interference in the performance of the Surveyor-General's responsibilities
The Opposition blamed Garbutt, and also her successor Mary Delahunty, for extreme political interference in the performance of the Surveyor-General's responsibilities. Such interference included: attempts to block or alter annual reports from the Surveyor-General; affix his electronic signature without his knowledge or permission; threats and intimidation by the former Executive Director of Land Victoria Elizabeth O'Keeffe; hiring of private investigators to investigate the Surveyor-General and his office; and efforts to interfere with his review of State electoral boundaries in his capacity as an Electoral Boundaries Commissioner. The responsible departmental secretaries were Chloe Munro (DNRE 1999-2002) and Lindsay Nielson (Department of Sustainability and Environment, from 2003).  Over the period 2001-04, The Age, Herald Sun and ABC carried numerous reports of such interference and it was frequently raised by the Opposition in both Houses of the Parliament of Victoria and was reported in Hansard.  It was also reported that O’Keeffe had approved an illegal $100,000 contract for a consultant to “lobby her own Minister” Garbutt to discredit the Surveyor-General. The contract was signed with the Australian Spatial Information Business Association (ASIBA), now known the Spatial Information Business Association (SIBA).  The contract was agreed between O'Keeffe and then ASIBA Chairman, Tony Wheeler, and then ASIBA Chief Executive Officer, David Hocking. The contract was signed with the concurrence of Garbutt and Munro.  After adverse media and Opposition reporting, the contract was found to not be appropriate and was cancelled after the first tranche of $25,000 was paid to ASIBA.Such reporting continued well after Bell resigned his appointment as Surveyor-General of Victoria in July 2003 and joined the World Bank. Notably, Bell, who served as the Surveyor-General 1999-2003, was later to be officially recognized for his professional service and contributions, including: (1) a Doctorate of Applied Science Honoris Causa, RMIT University in 2003; (ii) a Lifetime Achievement Award, The University of Melbourne in 2021; and (3) appointed as a Member of the Order of Australia in the 2022 Queen's Birthday Honours (Australia).

References

 

1948 births
Living people
Australian Labor Party members of the Parliament of Victoria
Members of the Victorian Legislative Assembly
Victorian Ministers for the Environment
Victorian Ministers for Women
20th-century Australian women politicians
Women members of the Victorian Legislative Assembly
Recipients of the Medal of the Order of Australia
21st-century Australian women politicians
Politicians from Melbourne
La Trobe University alumni
University of Melbourne alumni